Everybody's Golf, known in Japan as  and formerly known as Hot Shots Golf in North America, is a series of golf video games published by Sony Interactive Entertainment for the PlayStation series of video game consoles. The series has a humorous take on the game of golf that includes cartoon-like and anime-like characters and modes such as miniature golf paired with a realistic engine and precise ball physics.

Seven main games in the series have been published between 1997 and 2017 for every home console in the PlayStation brand, excluding the PlayStation 5. Another four spin-off editions (which include a similarly themed tennis game and various portable console versions) have been published for PlayStation Portable and PlayStation Vita platforms. The most recent title in the series is Everybody's Golf, released in August 2017. As of March 2017, the series had sold more than 14 million copies worldwide.

Games

Everybody's Golf (1997)

Everybody's Golf has several modes—including Tournament, Training, Stroke Play, and Match Play—as well as a Miniature Golf course.  The game features several unlockable characters that can be earned by defeating them.  The player gains experience points for their character by winning tournaments and hitting a variety of shots. These points are used to open new courses. Everybody's Gold features six different courses and a free-moving game camera.

Everybody's Golf 2 (1999)

The sequel Everybody's Golf 2 brings some improvements over the original, such as more realistic character models, which differed from the anime-style characters seen in the original game.

Everybody's Golf 2 also includes several game modes including Stroke, Match, and Tournament play, as well as Versus, through which new characters can be unlocked. Gameplay itself is a version of the standard '3 click' variety used by the majority of golf games.

This is the first game in the series to include characters from other games: Sweet Tooth from Twisted Metal, Sir Daniel Fortesque from MediEvil, and Gex from the Gex video game series. This set of characters exclusively appeared in the American and European versions.

Everybody's Golf 3 (2001)

The third installment to the series has similar but refined visuals. The game features the same '3 click' system for hitting the ball as its predecessor. The game sold over one million copies worldwide.

John Daly is an unlockable golfer in this game, which makes him the first real-life golfer to appear in the series. He appears only in the American release.

Everybody's Golf 4 (2003)

This game contains more realistic physics and better graphics.  In addition, the game introduced online play with the Network Adaptor.  The developers increased the number of characters from 15 to 24, added more caddies (10 in all) and boosted the number of courses from 6 to 15. Of these, 10 are new, while five are returning favorites from the previous game. The game also features an online Tournament mode where up to 32 players can compete against each other. The North American and European versions included online play, while Japanese did not. This game has a few guest characters from other games, including Jak (as a playable character) and Daxter (as a caddie) from the Jak and Daxter series, and Ratchet (as a playable character) and Clank (as a caddie) from the Rachet & Clank series.  The game was titled Hot Shots Golf Fore! in North America.

Everybody's Golf Portable (2004)

This game features three modes. The single-player game offers players the chance to unlock characters and items by competing in tournaments or by stroke play.  Training mode lets golfers practice their skills on various courses with no pressure. The wireless multiplayer mode allows up to eight players to play a course together in various head-to-head matches, real-time tournaments, or the new putting challenge.

The 10 new characters can be customized with more than 250 items of clothing, accessories, clubs, and balls for a unique style. Once players gain enough to go even further under par. The game was renamed Hot Shots Golf: Open Tee in North America.

Everybody's Tennis (2006)

This game has 14 characters, 5 umpires, and 11 tennis courts.  There are 3 different modes to choose from, which are Challenge Mode, Tennis with Everybody, and Training Mode. In Challenge Mode, the players play against computer-controlled opponents in order to unlock features like alternate costumes for characters and more courts to play on.  In Tennis with Everybody, there are play matches with 1 to 4 players. The training mode allows practice positioning and timing shots, and choosing from service, volley, smash and general practice.

A small number of the characters from the previous games of the series (both American and Japanese) make cameo appearances on the courts (usually only in Singles matches). Suzuki and Gloria return as being playable characters.

Everybody's Golf 5 (2007)

This version sold over 150,000 copies during its first week on sale. The game was renamed Hot Shots Golf: Out of Bounds in North America, and Everybody's Golf: World Tour in Europe.

Everybody's Golf Portable 2 (2007)

Notably, this title came with PSP System Software version 3.96, and is the only place where this firmware version can be found as it was never released online. The game was renamed Hot Shots Golf: Open Tee 2 in North America.

Everybody's Stress Buster (2009)

While the game was released as a UMD and PlayStation Network download in Japan and the rest of Asia, it was only a PlayStation Network release in Europe and North America (as Hot Shots Shorties in North America). This release was split into four download packs based on colours—Red, Green, Yellow, and Blue—with three games included in each. 

The title is a 12-game minigame collection, rather than a dedicated sports titles such as previous titles in the series. Minigames include book sorting, baseball, boxing, and vegetable fighting. Certain games can be played with characters from the Everybody's Golf and Tennis games.

Everybody's Tennis Portable (2010)

Another tennis game for the PlayStation Portable. Renamed in North America as Hot Shots Tennis: Get a Grip.

Everybody's Golf 6 (2011)

Everybody's Golf 6 borrows courses from Everybody's Golf 4 and downloadable content was available through the PlayStation Store. Players are able to leave each other comments through the "LiveArea" system. Players are able to view the golf course using PlayStation Vita's augmented reality feature. The game was renamed in North America as Hot Shots Golf: World Invitational.

Everybody’s Golf (2017)

The first Everybody's Golf title on PlayStation 4, was released worldwide in August 2017. The game marks the end of the alternate Hot Shots branding for the North American market, with the title Everybody's Golf being used worldwide.

Everybody’s Golf VR (2019)
Everybody's Golf VR is a PlayStation VR title and the first virtual reality game of the series. It was released worldwide in May 2019.

PlayStation Home

Clap Hanz released a space for the Everybody's Golf series in the Asian, European, and Japanese versions of the PlayStation 3's online community-based service, PlayStation Home. The space was called the "Everybody's Golf Space" in Europe, the "Minna no Golf Lounge" in Japan, and the "Hot Shots Golf Lounge" in North America (using the Asian version of game's name). The space featured a Questionnaire (in Europe called "A gift from Suzuki"), which is a survey that rewards an EG Lawn Sofa, a video screen, a poster, seats for the avatars, and a Full Game Launching Support feature for Everybody's Golf 5. Game Launching is a feature that lets users set up a game in PlayStation Home and launch directly into the game from Home. The space was released on 11 December 2008 for the Japanese version, 18 June 2009 for the European version, and 1 October 2009 for the North American version. It closed when PlayStation Home closed on 31 March 2015 worldwide.

Notes

References

External links
Developer Clap Hanz official site

 
Camelot Software Planning games
Golf video games
PlayStation Network games
Sony Interactive Entertainment franchises
Sony Interactive Entertainment games
Video game franchises
Video game franchises introduced in 1997